A Chiringuito (also known by other nicknames in Spanish) is a small enterprise, usually a  bar, selling mainly drinks and tapas, and sometimes meals, in a more or less provisional building, often on a beach or loose surface where a more permanent structure may be inviable. There are two main variants:
 Those found on beaches or at tourist attractions, which enjoy only brief but intense seasonal activity. These can be solid structures but are more often no-frills shelters or simply stalls capable of commanding a price premium compared to regular suppliers, as well as high turnover, yielding reasonable profits over a short span of time.
 Particularly in Andalucia and increasingly also much of Spain, such installations are a popular feature of markets, fiestas , the so-called 'ferias' like the Seville fair, and eventos, where they are called casetas since they often trade out of standardized prefabricated wooden boxes routinely set up in streets and town squares.

Since many chiringuito bars tend (or tended) to operate in the informal sector of the economy, the term is sometimes extended to any dodgy business activity or company that operates in loosely regulated grey markets or the unlawful black market sector.

In Mexico, the term changarro refers to a microbusiness like this type of food booth with tables, but more often to a small grocery stand or small grocery store.

See also
 Food booth
 Kiosk
 Farmers' market
 Flea market

References

Spanish cuisine
Types of drinking establishment
Restaurants by type